Park Valley is an unincorporated community in north-central Box Elder County, Utah, United States.

Description
Utah State Route 30 runs through the center of the valley, generally from east to west.

Park Valley anchors the northern end of the Great Basin. The Raft River Mountains to the north mark the boundary between the Great Basin and the Snake River Plain. What is called the community of Park Valley includes name locations that used to be nearly separate communities, such as Rosette, Dove Creek, Muddy, Rosebud, and Kelton, as well as ones that have been almost forgotten by time, such as Ten-Mile, Clear Creek, Rosen Valley, Terrace, Golden, Matlin, and other lesser camps along the old railroad grade. Since all of these areas belong to a homogeneous community, they are all known collectively as Park Valley. The valley center, or Park Valley proper, is the community center, which contains the church house, store, hotel, the park, and the schoolhouse.

History
In 1826, explorer Jedediah Smith passed through the area. In 1841, the Bartleson-Bidwell Party brought the first wagons through the valley.

While the Transcontinental Railroad coming to Utah did not pass directly through the valley, its proximity played an important part in the settlement and development of the area. Settlement was apparently a result of surveys conducted for several miles on either side of the railroad right-of-way. Even before the rails were joined at Promontory on May 10, 1869, the effect of the railroad on Park Valley had begun. The first permanent settler was William P. (Cotton) Thomas, who migrated from Brigham City in 1869, and developed a cattle ranch near Dove Creek. The heavy growth of trees along the creek and the view of the valley inspired the name.

The town experienced a minor boom in 1890 when gold was discovered.

Climate
According to the Köppen Climate Classification system, Park Valley has a semi-arid climate, abbreviated "BSk" on climate maps.

See also

References

External links

Unincorporated communities in Box Elder County, Utah
Unincorporated communities in Utah
Populated places established in 1869
1869 establishments in Utah Territory